Rachel Vail (born July 25, 1966), is an American author of children's and young adult books.

Life 
She was born in Manhattan, grew up in New Rochelle, New York, and is a graduate of Georgetown University. Her debut novel Wonder won an Editor's Choice award from Booklist in 1991, and in 1992 her second novel, Do-Over, won that award also.

Bibliography

Young adult novels
Wonder (1991)
Do-Over (1992)
Ever After (1994)
Daring to Be Abigail (1996)
The Friendship Ring series
If You Only Knew (1998)
Please, Please, Please (1998)
Not That I Care (1998)
What Are Friends For (1999)
Popularity Contest (2000)
Fill in The Blank (2000)
Never Mind: a Twin novel, co-written with Avi (2004)
If We Kiss (2005)
You, Maybe
Lucky (2008)
Gorgeous (2009)
Brilliant (2010)
Kiss Me Again (2013)
Unfriended, Puffin Books, 2015. , 
Well, That Was Awkward, New York, New York : Puffin Books, 2017. ,

Chapter Books 

 Justin Case series
 Justin Case: School, Drool, and Other Daily Disasters, illustrated by Matthew Cordell (2010) (Feiwel & Friends)
 Justin Case: Shells, Smells, and the Horrible Flip-Flops of Doom, illustrated by Matthew Cordell (2012) (Square Fish)
 Justin Case: Rules, Tools, and Maybe a Bully, illustrated by Matthew Cordell (2014) (Feiwel & Friends)
 Elizabeth Case series
A Is for Elizabeth, illustrated by Paige Keiser (2019) (Feiwel & Friends) 
 Big Mouth Elizabeth, illustrated by Paige Keiser (2019) (Feiwel & Friends) 
Cat Ears on Elizabeth, illustrated by Paige Keiser (2020) (Feiwel & Friends) 
Doodlebug Elizabeth, illustrated by Paige Keiser (2020) (Feiwel & Friends)

Children's picture books
Over the Moon, illustrated by Scott Nash (1998)
Sometimes I'm Bombaloo, illustrated by Yumi Heo (2001)
Mama Rex & T series, illustrated by Steve Björkman (2000–2003)
Mama Rex & T: Lose a WaffMama Rex & T: Run out of TapeMama Rex & T: Turn off the TVMama Rex & T: Stay Up LateMama Rex & T: Homework TroubleMama Rex & T: The (Almost) Perfect Mother's DayMama Rex & T: The Horrible Play DateMama Rex & T: The Sort-of-Super SnowmanMama Rex & T: The PrizeMama Rex & T: Halloween KnightMama Rex & T: The Reading ChampionRighty and Lefty, Illustrated by Matthew Cordell (2007)Jibberwillies at Night, illustrated by Yumi Heo (2008)Piggy Bunny, illustrated by Jeremy Tankard (2012) (Feiwel & Friends)Flabbersmashed About You, illustrated by Yumi Heo (2012) (Feiwel & Friends)Sometimes I Grumblesquinch, illustrated by Hyewon Yum (2022)

Short stories
 "Going Sentimental" in Places I Never Meant to Be: Original Stories by Censored Writers, edited by Judy Blume (1999)
 "One Hot Second" in One Hot Second: Stories about Desire, edited by Cathy Young (2002)
 "Thirteen and a Half" in Thirteen Stories That Capture the Agony and Ecstasty of Being Thirteen, edited by James Howe (2003)
 "The Crush" in Tripping Over the Lunch Lady and Other School Stories'', edited by Nancy E. Mercado (2004)

References

External links
Rachel Vail's official web site
Matia Burnett, In Full Blume: A Celebration of 'Judy Blumesday', PW, Feb 08, 2018

American children's writers
1966 births
Living people
Georgetown University alumni
American bloggers
Writers from New Rochelle, New York
20th-century American novelists
20th-century American short story writers
20th-century American women writers
21st-century American novelists
21st-century American short story writers
21st-century American women writers
American women novelists
American women short story writers
Novelists from New York (state)
American women bloggers
New Rochelle High School alumni